Isocladus may refer to two different genera:
 Isocladus, a genus of crustaceans in the family Sphaeromatidae
 Isocladus, a synonym for Sphagnum, a genus of plants